Petralia Sottana is a town and comune in the Metropolitan City of Palermo, in the island of Sicily, Southern Italy. The main characters in Emanuele Crialese's 2006 film of Sicilian immigration to America, Nuovomondo, come from the town of Petralia.

Geography 
The Madonie Mountains cover the commune. Petralia Sottana hosts the headquarters of the Madonie Regional Natural Park, in which is included a significant amount of its municipal territory.

The commune is on the border between the Metropolitan City of Palermo and the Province of Caltanissetta . It is bounded by the communes of Alimena, Blufi, Caltanissetta, Castelbuono, Castellana Sicula, Geraci Siculo, Isnello, Marianopoli, Petralia Soprana, Polizzi Generosa, Resuttano, Santa Caterina Villarmosa, Villalba.

Coat of arms
The coat of arms shows three lilies, referring to Lilium Petrae (Stone lily), a possible etymology of the town name.

Main sights

Maria Santissima Assunta (Chiesa Madre or Mother Church), known from the 9th century. Of the original building, only a portal in Gothic-Catalan style has survived. The current structure, with a nave and two aisles on the basilica plan, was built in 1633–1680. The sacristy houses a rare bronze lampstand dating back to the Arab conquest of Sicily, with an inscription in Kufic characters
San Francesco d'Assisi: 17th century church
Santissima Trinità: (1531) church formerly attached to abbey
Palazzo del Giglio: current town hall
Santa Maria alla FontanaMuseo Civico Antonio Collisani'': Civic museum with archeological and geological-paleontological collections
Grotta del Vecchiuzzo, a prehistoric cave where archeological finds dating back to the Late Neolithic were discovered
Sanctuary of the Madonna dell'Alto

People
Luciano Chiara, mathematician
Giuseppe Colosi, zoologist
Antonio Pucci, racing driver
Cesare Terranova, judge and politician killed by the Mafia

References

External links
Official website

Municipalities of the Metropolitan City of Palermo
Late Neolithic
Petralia Sottana